Ann Haymond Zwinger (1925–2014) was the author of many natural histories noted for detail and lyrical prose.

Biography
Ann Haymond Zwinger was born March 12, 1925, in Muncie, Indiana, the daughter of William and Ann Haymond. While young, she lived along the White River. She studied art history and was awarded two degrees, an A.B. in Arts in 1946 by Wellesley College with the designation "Wellesley College Scholar," now considered roughly equivalent to "cum laude," and an A.M. in Fine Arts by Indiana University in 1950. She married Herman H. Zwinger, a pilot, in 1952.

In 1960, Zwinger moved to Colorado Springs with her husband and began to study Western ecology. In 1970, her first book was published, Beyond the Aspen Grove. She and co-author Beatrice Willard were finalists for the 1973 National Book Award in science for Land Above the Trees. Run, River, Run was another distinguished book published in 1975. It received glowing reviews by The New York Times, the John Burroughs Memorial Association Gold Medal for a distinguished contribution in natural history, and the Friends of American Writers Award for non-fiction. Her more than 20 books on natural history often featured her own illustrations.

She taught Southwest Studies and English at Colorado College.

Zwinger died in Portland, Oregon on August 30, 2014.

Bibliography
 Beyond the Aspen Grove, 1970
 Land Above the Trees: A Guide to American Alpine Tundra, 1972
 Run, River, Run: A Naturalist's Journey Down One of the Great Rivers of the West, 1975
 Wind in the Rock: The Canyonlands of Southeastern Utah, 1978
 A Conscious Stillness: Two Naturalists on Thoreau's Rivers, 1982
 A Desert Country near the Sea: A Natural History of the Cape Region of Baja California, 1983
 John Xantus: The Fort Tejon Letters, 1857-1859 (editor), 1986
 The Mysterious Lands: A Naturalist Explores the Four Great Deserts of the Southwest, 1989
 Aspen: Blazon of the High Country, 1991
 Writing the Western Landscape, 1994
 Downcanyon: A Naturalist Explores the Colorado River Through Grand Canyon, 1995
 Women in Wilderness: Writings and Photographs, 1995
 The Nearsighted Naturalist, 1998
 Nature's Fading Chorus: Classic And Contemporary Writings On Amphibians, 2000
 Shaped by Wind and Water: Reflections of a Naturalist, 2000
 Spanish Peaks: Land and Legends, 2001
 Fall Colors Across North America, 2001
 Yosemite: Valley of Thunder, 2002
 Grand Canyon: Little Things in a Big Place, 2006
 Introduction to The Sea Around Us by Rachel Carson, 1979
 Foreword to The Forgotten Peninsula by Joseph Wood Krutch, 1986 e.
 Foreword to The Naturalist's Path; Beginning the Study of Nature, by Cathy Johnson, 1987, 1991
 Foreword to On Becoming Lost; A Naturalist's Search for Meaning, by Cathy Johnson, 1990
 Introduction to The Walker's Companion by Bill and Margaret Forbes, illustrated in part by Cathy Johnson, et al., 1995
 Introduction to Into the Field: A Guide to Locally Focused Teaching by Clare Walker Leslie, 1999
 Epilogue to Nature's Fading Chorus: Classic and Contemporary Writings on Amphibians by Gordon L. Miller (editor), 2000
 Foreword to Profitably Soaked by Robert Lawrence France, 2003
 Foreword to River And Desert Plants of the Grand Canyon by Kristin Huisinga, 2006
 Foreword to America: A Photographic Journey by Suzan Hall, Fred Hirschmann, 2007

References

 Wild, Peter (1993). Ann Zwinger. Boise, Idaho: Boise State University "Western Writers Series" (#111). pp. 51.

External links
 Our Land, Our Literature
  Bookfest

1925 births
John Burroughs Medal recipients
Wellesley College alumni
20th-century American non-fiction writers
21st-century American non-fiction writers
20th-century American women writers
21st-century American women writers
2014 deaths
Women science writers
American nature writers
American women non-fiction writers